James Angus MacKinnon,  (October 4, 1881 – April 18, 1958) was a Canadian politician. MacKinnon would serve as a Member of Parlimant, Cabinet Minister and later Senator from Alberta.

Early life
James Agnus MacKinnon was in Port Elgin, Ontario on October 4, 1881 to James MacKinnon and Margaret Tolmie MacKinnon, both of Scottish descent.

Political life
MacKinnon was first elected to the House of Commons of Canada representing the riding of Edmonton West in the 1935 federal election. A Liberal, he was re-elected in 1940 and 1945. He held many cabinet positions in the cabinets of William Lyon Mackenzie King and Louis Stephen St-Laurent including Minister without Portfolio, Minister of Trade and Commerce, Minister of National Revenue (Acting), Minister of Fisheries, and Minister of Mines and Resources. As Minister of Trade and Commerce during the Second World War, MacKinnon strove to orient Canadian trade policy towards Latin America when the war cut off many Canadian markets.

He did not seek re-election to the House in the 1949 election. He was appointed to the Senate of Canada representing the senatorial division of Edmonton, Alberta. From 1949 to 1950, while a senator, he was a minister without portfolio in the cabinet of Louis St-Laurent.

MacKinnon died in office in 1958.

Personal life
MacKinnon married Irene Sharpe from Prince Edward Island on June 28, 1911, and had one adopted daughter, Keltie. She died on October 31, 1968, leaving her husband Denis Slattery, and five children, Sandy White (née Slattery), Gayle Slattery, John Slattery, Jim Slattery and Ann Varszegi (née Slattery).

MacKinnon was given an honorary Doctorate in Laws from the University of Alberta on October 23, 1948.

Archives 
There is a James Angus MacKinnon fonds at Library and Archives Canada.

References

External links

1881 births
1958 deaths
Canadian senators from Alberta
Liberal Party of Canada MPs
Liberal Party of Canada senators
Members of the House of Commons of Canada from Alberta
Members of the King's Privy Council for Canada
People from Bruce County
Canadian people of Scottish descent